The Legend of the Hidden City was a South African action adventure series, directed by David Lister, which was broadcast by SABC and SABC2 between 1996 and 1998 as two series with a total of 39 episodes. It was also shown by Sky1 and Five in the United Kingdom, Network 2 (as part of the children's strand The Den in Ireland), Channel 2 in Jordan, ZBC in Zimbabwe, Fun Channel in The Middle East, Kids Channel in Israel and by Canal Famille in Québec, Canada.

Plot
The series followed the lives of archaeology students who discover an ancient city in the wilderness unknown to civilisation. As the series progresses, the youngsters Dean and Thabo who survived the helicopter crash (as does Dean's girlfriend Nina  but they believe she's dead for much of the series), endure tests and riches, made friends with the inhabitants of the city.

Production
The series was produced by Dandelion Distribution Ltd, Wehmeyer Productions, SABC (Series 1 only) and Six Street Studios. It was filmed on location and at Johannesburg and Knysna.

A compilation of episodes from the first series was later released on DVD as a film called The Lost City.

Series 1
26 half hour episodes.

Cast

Brendan Pollecutt as Dean
Fezile Mpela as Thabo (All episodes except episode 23)
Robert Finlayson as Lord Ram (later King Ram in episodes 14-26)
Gina Borthwick as Princess Kama
Danielle Crouse as Nina (Episodes 1-2/6-26)
Nkhensani Manganyi as Briah
Wilson Dunster as Ammon
Adrienne Pearce as Kabeth
Andre Jacobs as Morgan
Clive Scott as King Nerada
Victor Melleney as Supreme Counsellor Kuth
Owen Sejake as Inquisitor Balik
Keith Grenville as Professor Saunders
Nicky Rebelo as Colonel Senek
David Dukas as Commander Julak (Episodes 4-5/12-13/24-26)
Peter Krummeck
Sello Sebotsane as Oteth
Michael Richard
Bill Flynn
Dale Cutts
Anthony Bishop as Monek
Ray Ntlokwana
Leila Henriques as Commander Nefret
Michael Swinton
Charles Kinsman
John Lesley as Counsellor Murhat
Iain Winter
Peter Piccolo
Brigid Erin Jones as Princess Kama’s Aunt
Di Appleby
Robert Fridjohn
Lisa Hall
Wandile Mthetwa as the Bolinga Warrior
Frank Opperman
Greg Latter
Norman Coombes
Gordon Mulholland
Liz Staughton
Cathy Minaar
Peter Gordon
Sam Williams
Stephanie Kronson
Hennie Oosthuizen as the Doctor
John Maytham
Gillian Garlick
Sechaba Morojele as King Ram's Guard (Episode 15)
Ashley Hayden
Ulrich Chateris
Amanda Wilson
Roley Jansen
Peter Grobler
Org Smal
Jan Tooley
James Whyle
Peter Guy
Thomas Hall
Julian Munro
Zane Hannan
Len Sparrow Hawk
Tim Mahoney
David Sherwood as Stall Trader (Episode 15)
Macair Cox
Grant Sutherland
Lillian Dube
Zukile Quobose
Samantha Bembridge
Nick Borain
Flip Theron
Kim Van Schoor
Cait Pocock
Robin Smith
Gil Oved
Ashley Taylor
Debi Brown
Shelley Heskin

Production crew
Co-Executive Producer: Awie Bosman
Executive Producer: Noel Cronin
Line Producer: Peter Clausing
Production/Costume Designer: Hans Nel
Director of Photography: Johan Scheepers
Film Editor: Johan Lategan
Music Composed by: Toby Langton-Gilks
Written by: Lindsay Du Plessis, Sheila Keen, Niall Johnson and Stephanie Pickover
Produced by: Tokkie Wehmeyer
Directed by: David Lister

Series 2
13 half hour episodes

Cast

Brendan Pollecutt as Dean
Fezile Mpela as Thabo
Robert Finlayson as King Ram
Gina Borthwick as Queen Kama
Danny Keogh as Darlock (Episodes 1-12)
David Dukas as Commander Julak (later Prince Julak in episodes 8-13)
Nkhensani Manganyi as Briah
Robert Whitehead as Marek (Episodes 1-8/11-13)
Wilson Dunster as Ammon
Adrienne Pearce as Kabeth
Andre Jacobs as Morgan
Michael McCabe
Carrie Glyn
David Sherwood as Kari's Father
John Lesley as Counsellor Murhat
Sechaba Morojele as Inquisitor Larek
Candice Hillebrand as Kari (Episodes 6/8-13)
Cait Pocock
Wandile Mthetwa as Bolinga Warrior
Donald Woodburn
Anne Power
Shelly Meskin
Alexandra Bowles
Jonathan Pienaar
Peter Perry
Joseph Morapedi
Sam Williams
Pats Bookholane
Greg Melvill-Smith as the Prison Warden
Neville Thomas as Kanek
Andrew Horne
Rick Rogers
Peter Fenwick
Leonard Mkhizi
Timothy Christie
Sityhilelo Bontsi
James Edwards
Simon Dowdeswell
Vanessa Pike
Robert McCarthy
Matthew Roberts
Hennie Oosthuizen as the Doctor
Eric Nobbs
Roland Visser
Bismillah Nduka
Richard Nwamba
Nicholas Ashby
Iain Winter-Smith
Candice Herman
Chris Chameleon
Roderick Jaftha
Danielle Crouse as Nina Saunders (Episodes 1-2)

Production crew
Executive Producer: Noel Cronin
Line Producer: Johann Schoeman
Production/Costume Designer: Hans Nel
Director of Photography: Vincent C. Cox
Film Editor: Johan Lategan
Music Composed by: Toby Langton-Gilks
Written by: Lindsay Du Plessis
Produced by: Tokkie Wehmeyer
Directed by: David Lister
Script Editor: Awie Bosman

References

External links
 Legend of the Hidden City at the Internet Movie Database

South African Broadcasting Corporation television shows
1996 South African television series debuts
1998 South African television series endings
1990s South African television series
SABC 2 original programming
Television shows set in South Africa
Adventure television series
Fantasy television series
Television about magic
Archaeology in popular culture